This is a list of newspapers currently published in Åland.

Daily
Alandstidningen
Nya Åland

Official
 Press releases from the Government of Åland

See also
 List of newspapers

References

External links

Åland
Mass media in Åland
Culture of Åland